Lee station is a suburban station on Burnt Ash Hill in Lee in south-east London, England, between Hither Green and Mottingham on the Dartford loop (also known as the Sidcup line). The station name appears as Lee (London) on tickets. It was opened by the South Eastern Railway in 1866.

It is operated by Southeastern.

History

The station opened on 1 September 1866. Goods facilities were meagre at first with a single siding on the down side just east of the station building, but the goods yard was gradually enlarged over the years as freight traffic increased in importance. In the early 1870s a second siding was installed dedicated to coal, and a coal shed was erected across the track. Later a further pair of sidings was inserted alongside the existing tracks. In 1955 the platforms were lengthened to accommodate ten carriage trains. In British Railways days the SR green totem signs displayed the station name as Lee for Burnt Ash. The goods yard closed in 1968. In 1988 the clapboard up side ticket office was demolished and replaced by a new ticket office. In 1992 the platforms were lengthened to accommodate twelve carriage trains.

Location

Lee Station is in Burnt Ash Road, Lee, in the London Borough of Lewisham.

Connections
London Buses routes 202, 261 and 273 serve the station.

Facilities

The station has two platforms. Platform 1 the up platform for services to London and Platform 2 the down platform for services to Kent. A ticket hall is situated on the up side but the station has no ticket gates. There is a subway connecting both platforms. There is step free access to both platforms.

Services

The typical off-peak service in trains per hour is:

The station is also served by a single peak hour return service between Dartford and London Blackfriars.

References

External links

 Southeastern Trains website

Railway stations in the London Borough of Lewisham
Former South Eastern Railway (UK) stations
Railway stations in Great Britain opened in 1866
Railway stations served by Southeastern
Railway station
1866 establishments in England